Shenzhen Metro Line 9 opened on 28 October 2016. The line runs East–West from Qianwan to Wenjin.

Naming 
Line 9 was previously known as the Meilin line, and before that as the Neihuan line, which means an inner ring line. In December 2011 the name was changed along with the planned alignment.

Construction
Construction of Line 9 started in 2012, with main stations completed in July 2014, other stations in March 2015 with tunnels planned for September 2016 and trial operation for October 2016. Shenzhen Metro Line 3 Operations was responsible for construction and planning of the line, until their merger with SZMC (Shenzhen Metro Group) in April 2011.

Stations

Rolling stock 
In 2014, Shenzhen Metro Group purchased 70 trains (420 carriages) from CNR Changchun Railway Vehicles for the future Line 7 and Line 9, in which Line 7 will use 41 while Line 9 will use 29. The first train arrived in mid-March 2016. 17 trains will assume operations when the line first opens to passengers, departing every 6–8 minutes.

Notes

References

Shenzhen Metro lines